Mary of Lancaster, Baroness Percy ( – 1 September 1362), was the youngest surviving child of Henry, 3rd Earl of Lancaster by his wife Maud Chaworth. Through her father, she was a great-granddaughter of Henry III of England.

Family
Mary was born in 1320 or 1321. She was a sister of Henry of Grosmont, 1st Duke of Lancaster, Maud, Countess of Ulster, Joan, Baroness de Mowbray, and Eleanor, Countess of Arundel. Through her brother Henry, she was the aunt of Blanche of Lancaster, first wife of John of Gaunt and mother of Henry IV of England.

Marriage
Near September 1334 at Tutbury Castle, she married Henry Percy, eldest son of Henry de Percy, 2nd Baron Percy and Idoine de Clifford. He succeeded his father as 3rd Baron Percy in 1352.

They had the following surviving issue:

 Henry Percy, 1st Earl of Northumberland (10 November 1341 – 20 February 1408) married firstly Margaret Neville and secondly Maud, Baroness Lucy.
 Thomas Percy, 1st Earl of Worcester (1344–1403).

Death
Mary died at Alnwick, Northumberland, England on 1 September 1362, where she was also buried. Her husband Henry would marry a second time to Joan Orreby, daughter and heiress of John, 2nd Lord Orreby.

Ancestry

References

Works cited

 

House of Plantagenet
1320s births
1362 deaths
14th-century English people
14th-century English women
Daughters of British earls
Percy